The buff-rumped woodpecker (Meiglyptes tristis) is a species of bird in the family Picidae.
It is found in southern Myanmar, Thailand, Malaya, Java, Sumatra and Borneo.
Its natural habitats are subtropical or tropical dry forests and subtropical or tropical moist lowland forests.

The buff-rumped woodpecker was described by the American naturalist Thomas Horsfield in 1821 under the binomial name Picus tristis from a specimen collected in Java. The specific epithet tristis is Latin for "sad" or "gloomy". The species is now placed in the genus Meiglyptes that was introduced by the English naturalist William John Swainson in 1837.

Two subspecies are recognised:
 M. t. grammithorax (Malherbe, 1862) – Malay Peninsula, Sumatra, Borneo and nearby islands
 M. t. tristis (Horsfield, 1821) – Java

Some authorities treat the two subspecies as separate species with M. grammithorax as the buff-rumped woodpecker and M. tristis as the white-rumped woodpecker.

References

External links
Image at ADW 

buff-rumped woodpecker
Birds of Malesia
buff-rumped woodpecker
Taxonomy articles created by Polbot